Tropidurus semitaeniatus, the striped lava lizard, is a species of lizard of the Tropiduridae family. It is found in Brazil.

References

Tropidurus
Reptiles described in 1825
Reptiles of Brazil
Endemic fauna of Brazil
Taxa named by Johann Baptist von Spix